House of Memories, or variants, may refer to:

Books
In the House of Memories, a 1946 book by Jens Christian Bay
House of Memories, a romance novel by  Margaret Way 1983  
My House of Memories, autobiography by Merle Haggard
The House of Memory – A Novel of Shanghai, by Nicholas R. Clifford (see List of fiction set in Shanghai)
The House of Memory: Stories by Jewish Women Writers of Latin America, anthology ed. Marjorie Agosín (1999) Bárbara Mujica (writer), Luisa Futoransky and others

Film and TV
House of Memories (film) (Paromitar Ek Din), a 2000 Indian Bengali drama film
La casa del recuerdo (The House of Memory), a 1940 Argentine film by Luis Saslavsky
"House of Memories", episode of Wynonna Earp (TV series)

Music
 "House of Memories" (song), a song by Panic! at the Disco from Death of a Bachelor
 "House of Memories", a song by Merle Haggard from the 1967 album I'm a Lonesome Fugitive
 "House of Memories (Lindsay's Song)", a song by Ten Shekel Shirt from Much
 My House of Memories, a recording of Merle Haggard's autobiography (see Grammy Award for Best Spoken Word Album)